Kustovoye is a rural locality (a selo) and the administrative center of Kustovskoye Rural Settlement, Yakovlevsky District, Belgorod Oblast, Russia. The population was 1,679 as of 2010. There are 8 streets.

Geography 
Kustovoye is located 33 km southwest of Stroitel (the district's administrative centre) by road. Seretino is the nearest rural locality.

References 

Rural localities in Yakovlevsky District, Belgorod Oblast
Grayvoronsky Uyezd